Western Slope may refer to:
Colorado Western Slope, a region of Colorado, US
Western Slope, Jersey City, US